Corey Johnson (born September 23, 1973) is a former Arena football defensive back in the Arena Football League. He played college football at Georgia.

Johnson played for the Nashville Kats, Los Angeles Avengers, Buffalo Destroyers, Carolina Cobras, New York Dragons, and Arizona Rattlers. On April 10, 2005, Johnson; playing for the Dragons in a game against the L.A. Avengers, was the recipient of a tackle by Al Lucas, that resulted in Lucas' death from a spinal cord injury.

References

1973 births
Living people
People from Forest Park, Georgia
Sportspeople from the Atlanta metropolitan area
American football cornerbacks
American football safeties
Georgia Bulldogs football players
Nashville Kats players
Los Angeles Avengers players
Buffalo Destroyers players
Carolina Cobras players
New York Dragons players
Arizona Rattlers players